Memrise is a British language platform that uses spaced repetition of flashcards to increase the rate of learning, combined with a GPT3-powered "AI Language partner" that allows learners to practice human-like conversations, which Memrise believe can help learners to overcome the "confidence gap" in language acquisition.   It is based in London, UK.

Memrise offers user-generated content on a wide range of other subjects. The Memrise app has courses in 16 languages and its combinations, while the website has a great many more languages available. As of 2018, the app had 35 million registered users. Memrise has been profitable since late 2016, having a turnover of $4 million monthly.

History
Memrise was founded by Ed Cooke, a Grand Master of Memory, Ben Whately and Greg Detre, a Princeton neuroscientist specializing in the science of memory and forgetting. The website launched in private beta after winning the Princeton Entrepreneurship Club 2009 TigerLaunch competition.

On 1 October 2012, 100 users were allowed to sign up to test a non-beta version of the website called Memrise 1.0. As of May 2013, a Memrise app has been available for download on both the App Store (iOS) and Google Play.

As of January 2020, the app received $21.8 million of investments in a total of seven seed rounds.

Spaced repetition

Memrise makes language studying a game, like its competitor Duolingo. Memrise uses spaced repetition to accelerate language acquisition. Spaced repetition is an evidence-based learning technique that incorporates increasing intervals of time between subsequent review of previously learned material to exploit the psychological spacing effect.  The use of spaced repetition has been shown to increase the rate of memorization.

Although the principle is useful in many contexts, spaced repetition is commonly applied in contexts in which a learner must acquire a large number of items and retain them indefinitely in memory. It is, therefore, well suited for the problem of vocabulary acquisition in the course of second language learning, due to the size of the target language's inventory of open-class words.

Awards

In July 2010, Memrise was named as one of the winners of the London Mini-Seedcamp competition. In November 2010, the site was named as one of the finalists for the 2010 TechCrunch Europas Start-up of the Year. In March 2011, it was selected as one of the Techstars Boston startups. In May 2017, Memrise was named as the winner of the "Best App" award at the second edition of the Google Play awards.

Criticism
Starting in late February 2019, Memrise has been the subject of much criticism due to an announcement that user-created content will be moving to a different web-based platform. It was announced that this new website would not have an app and that users would be unable to access their material offline. In response, the Memrise forums were bombarded with posts criticizing this as a slap in the face to Memrise's users and content-creators. This criticism has followed onto Reddit with many users calling for migration to rival platforms. On 25 February 2020, as a response to the criticisms, Memrise decided to undo the split (i.e. closing Decks and merging its content back to the Memrise main site).

In late September 2012, the leaderboard on the website was temporarily suspended due to "extensive cheating". Specific users had been using bots and non-intensive mechanisms, such as celebrity photo memory courses, to achieve atypical scores that were not reflective of actual learning. In response, the administrators established a new leaderboard after revising the scoring loopholes.

See also
 Anki
 Computer-assisted language learning
 Fluenz
 Lang-8
 Language education
 Language pedagogy
 List of flashcard software
 List of language self-study programs
 Rosetta Stone

References

External links
 
 iTunes App Store
 Google Play

British educational websites
Spaced repetition software
Mnemonics
Crowdsourcing
Internet properties established in 2010
Language education in the United Kingdom
Language-learning websites
Proprietary language learning software
Android (operating system) software